Lee In-jae  (born 13 May 1992) is a South Korean footballer who plays as defender for Seoul E-Land FC.

Career
Lee joined K League 2 side Ansan Greeners before 2017 season starts.

He joined Seoul E-Land FC in 2020.

References

1992 births
Living people
Association football defenders
South Korean footballers
Ulsan Hyundai Mipo Dockyard FC players
Ansan Greeners FC players
Seoul E-Land FC players
Korea National League players
K League 2 players
Dankook University alumni